Pseudochazara cingovskii, the Macedonian grayling, is a species of butterfly in the family Nymphalidae. It is found only in the North Macedonian village of Pletvar. The males are a little smaller than the females.

It is a cool pale grey brown, the upperside bands being particularly noticeable. Its habitat is scattered with white limestone rocks and when at rest on the white limestone, it is very difficult to notice it due to its very pale underside. The Macedonian Grayling is facing endangerment due to marble quarrying occurring in its habitat. This endemic species is the most threatened butterfly species in Europe, and active conservation efforts are vital for sustaining a healthy population size.

Flight period
The species is univoltine and is on wing from late June to July depending on altitude.

Food plants

Larvae have been reared on grasses.

References

Species info
"Pseudochazara de Lesse, 1951" at Markku Savela's Lepidoptera and Some Other Life Forms
Butterflies of Europe, Tom Tolman, 1997, Princeton University Press

External links
 Satyrinae of the Western Palearctic - Pseudochazara cingovskii

Cingovskii
Endemic fauna of North Macedonia
Butterflies described in 1973
Butterflies of Europe